The 1936 Venezuelan presidential election was held in Venezuela on 28 April 1936, to elect the successor of deceased President of Venezuela Juan Vicente Gómez. This presidential election was indirect, that is, the voters were the deputies and senators of the Congress of Venezuela. The winner on this day was provisional president Eleazar López Contreras with 121 votes, 98.37% of the seats in the Congress, who was elected as president for the 1936–1943 constitutional period.

Background 

General Juan Vicente Gómez, who had ruled Venezuela as president intermittently since 19 December 1908, died on 17 December 1935. Although ruled the country in authoritarian manner, Gómez also achieved national modernization in different areas: He created the country's first airliner (Aeropostal Alas de Venezuela), commissioned the construction of the first Venezuelan airports, building of bridges, customs buildings, the first passenger terminals of extra-urban bus lines, as well as the famous Transandean Highway. Gómez also modernized, professionalized and institutionalized the National Armed Forces, which still retains the Gomezist structure.

After the death of Gómez, the Minister of War and Navy, General Eleazar López Contreras, managed to quell a conspiracy of the Gómez's family members to obtain and perpetuate themselves in power, for which the Cabinet of Venezuela appointed him as provisional president until the holding of elections.

Candidates 
For these elections, the presidential candidates were the following:

 Eleazar López Contreras, military officer and politician from Queniquea, who had served as Minister of War and Navy under Gómez since 1931 and provisional president since 1935, period in which a process of democratic transition began in Venezuela.
 , lawyer and politician from Maracaibo, activist opposed to the Gómez's government, who was also imprisoned in the San Carlos Prison.

Results

References 

1936 in Venezuela
1936 elections in South America
Elections in Venezuela
1936
Indirect elections